MPEG-2 (a.k.a. H.222/H.262 as was defined by the ITU) is a standard for "the generic coding of moving pictures and associated audio information". It describes a combination of lossy video compression and lossy audio data compression methods, which permit storage and transmission of movies using currently available storage media and transmission bandwidth. While MPEG-2 is not as efficient as newer standards such as H.264/AVC and H.265/HEVC, backwards compatibility with existing hardware and software means it is still widely used, for example in over-the-air digital television broadcasting and in the DVD-Video standard.

Main characteristics
MPEG-2 is widely used as the format of digital television signals that are broadcast by terrestrial (over-the-air), cable, and direct broadcast satellite TV systems.  It also specifies the format of movies and other programs that are distributed on DVD and similar discs. TV stations, TV receivers, DVD players, and other equipment are often designed to this standard.  MPEG-2 was the second of several standards developed by the Moving Pictures Expert Group (MPEG) and is an international standard (ISO/IEC 13818). Parts 1 and 2 of MPEG-2 were developed in a collaboration with ITU-T, and they have a respective catalog number in the ITU-T Recommendation Series.

While MPEG-2 is the core of most digital television and DVD formats, it does not completely specify them.  Regional institutions can adapt it to their needs by restricting and augmenting aspects of the standard.  See Video profiles and levels.

Systems

MPEG-2 includes a Systems section, part 1, that defines two distinct, but related, container formats. One is the transport stream, a data packet format designed to transmit one data packet in four ATM data packets for streaming digital video and audio over fixed or mobile transmission mediums, where the beginning and the end of the stream may not be identified, such as radio frequency, cable and linear recording mediums, examples of which include ATSC/DVB/ISDB/SBTVD broadcasting, and HDV recording on tape. The other is the program stream, an extended version of the MPEG-1 container format with less overhead than transport stream. Program stream is designed for random access storage mediums such as hard disk drives, optical discs and flash memory.

Transport stream file formats include M2TS, which is used on Blu-ray discs, AVCHD on re-writable DVDs and HDV on compact flash cards. Program stream files include VOB on DVDs and Enhanced VOB on the short lived HD DVD.  The standard MPEG-2 transport stream contains packets of 188 bytes. M2TS prepends each packet with 4 bytes containing a 2-bit copy permission indicator and 30-bit timestamp.

MPEG-2 Systems is formally known as ISO/IEC 13818-1 and as ITU-T Rec. H.222.0. ISO authorized the "SMPTE Registration Authority, LLC" as the registration authority for MPEG-2 format identifiers. The registration descriptor of MPEG-2 transport is provided by ISO/IEC 13818–1 in order to enable users of the standard to unambiguously carry data when its format is not necessarily a recognized international standard. This provision will permit the MPEG-2 transport standard to carry all types of data while providing for a method of unambiguous identification of the characteristics of the underlying private data.

Video

The Video section, part 2 of MPEG-2, is similar to the previous MPEG-1 standard, but also provides support for interlaced video, the format used by analog broadcast TV systems. MPEG-2 video is not optimized for low bit rates, especially less than 1 Mbit/s at standard-definition resolutions. All standards-compliant MPEG-2 Video decoders are fully capable of playing back MPEG-1 Video streams conforming to the Constrained Parameters Bitstream syntax. MPEG-2/Video is formally known as ISO/IEC 13818-2 and as ITU-T Rec. H.262.

With some enhancements, MPEG-2 Video and Systems are also used in some HDTV transmission systems, and is the standard format for over-the-air ATSC digital television.

Audio

MPEG-2 introduces new audio encoding methods compared to MPEG-1:

MPEG-2 Part 3 

The MPEG-2 Audio section, defined in Part 3 (ISO/IEC 13818-3) of the standard, enhances MPEG-1's audio by allowing the coding of audio programs with more than two channels, up to 5.1 multichannel. This method is backwards-compatible (also known as MPEG-2 BC), allowing MPEG-1 audio decoders to decode the two main stereo components of the presentation. MPEG-2 part 3 also defined additional bit rates and sample rates for MPEG-1 Audio Layer I, II and III.

MPEG-2 BC (backward compatible with MPEG-1 audio formats)
 low bitrate encoding with halved sampling rate (MPEG-1 Layer 1/2/3 LSF - a.k.a. MPEG-2 LSF - "Low Sampling Frequencies")
 multichannel encoding with up to 5.1 channels, a.k.a. MPEG Multichannel

MPEG-2 Part 7 

Part 7 (ISO/IEC 13818-7) of the MPEG-2 standard specifies a rather different, non-backwards-compatible audio format (also known as MPEG-2 NBC). Part 7 is referred to as MPEG-2 AAC. AAC is more efficient than the previous MPEG audio standards, and is in some ways less complicated than its predecessor, MPEG-1 Audio, Layer 3, in that it does not have the hybrid filter bank. It supports from 1 to 48 channels at sampling rates of 8 to 96 kHz, with multichannel, multilingual, and multiprogram capabilities. Advanced Audio is also defined in Part 3 of the MPEG-4 standard.

MPEG-2 NBC (Non-Backward Compatible)
 MPEG-2 AAC
 multichannel encoding with up to 48 channels

ISO/IEC 13818
MPEG-2 standards are published as parts of ISO/IEC 13818. Each part covers a certain aspect of the whole specification.
 Part 1 Systems – describes synchronization and multiplexing of video and audio. (It is also known as ITU-T Rec. H.222.0.) See MPEG transport stream and MPEG program stream.
 Part 2 Video – video coding format for interlaced and non-interlaced video signals (Also known as ITU-T Rec. H.262).
 Part 3 Audio – audio coding format for perceptual coding of audio signals. A multichannel-enabled extension and extension of bit rates and sample rates for MPEG-1 Audio Layer I, II and III.
 Part 4 Describes procedures for testing compliance.
 Part 5 Describes systems for Software simulation.
 Part 6 Describes extensions for DSM-CC (Digital Storage Media Command and Control).
 Part 7 Advanced Audio Coding (AAC).
 Part 8 10-bit video extension. Primary application was studio video, allowing artifact-free processing without giving up compression. Part 8 has been withdrawn due to lack of interest by industry.
 Part 9 Extension for real time interfaces.
 Part 10 Conformance extensions for DSM-CC.
 Part 11 Intellectual property management (IPMP)

History
MPEG-2 evolved out of the shortcomings of MPEG-1.

MPEG-1's known weaknesses:
 An audio compression system limited to two channels (stereo).
 No standardized support for interlaced video with poor compression when used for interlaced video
 Only one standardized "profile" (Constrained Parameters Bitstream), which was unsuited for higher resolution video. MPEG-1 could support 4k video but there was no easy way to encode video for higher resolutions, and identify hardware capable of supporting it, as the limitations of such hardware were not defined.
 Support for only one chroma subsampling, 4:2:0.

Sakae Okubo of NTT was  the ITU-T coordinator for developing the H.262/MPEG-2 Part 2 video coding standard and the requirements chairman in MPEG for the MPEG-2 set of standards. The majority of patents underlying MPEG-2 technology are owned by three companies: Sony (311 patents), Thomson (198 patents) and Mitsubishi Electric (119 patents). Hyundai Electronics (now SK Hynix) developed the first MPEG-2 SAVI (System/Audio/Video) decoder in 1995.

Filename extensions 
.mpg, .mpeg, .m2v, .mp2, .mp3 are some of a number of filename extensions used for MPEG-1 or MPEG-2 audio and video file formats.

File extension MP3 (formally MPEG-1 Audio Layer III or MPEG-2 Audio Layer III) is a coding format for digital audio developed largely by the Fraunhofer Society in Germany, with support from other digital scientists in the United States and elsewhere.

Applications

DVD-Video 

The DVD-Video standard uses MPEG-2 video, but imposes some restrictions:
 Allowed Dimensions
 720 × 480, 704 × 480, 352 × 480, 352 × 240 pixel (NTSC)
 720 × 576, 704 × 576, 352 × 576, 352 × 288 pixel (PAL)
 Allowed Aspect ratios (Display AR)
 4:3 (for letterboxed widescreen and non-widescreen frames)
 16:9  (for anamorphic widescreen)

 Allowed frame rates
 29.97 interlaced frame/s (NTSC)
 23.978 progressive frame/s (for NTSC 2:3 pull-down to 29.97)
 25 interlaced frame/s (PAL)

 Audio + video bitrate
 Video peak 9.8 Mbit/s
 Total peak 10.08 Mbit/s
 Minimum 300 kbit/s
 YUV 4:2:0
 Additional subtitles possible
 Closed captioning (NTSC only)
 Audio
 Linear Pulse Code Modulation (LPCM): 48 kHz or 96 kHz; 16- or 24-bit; up to six channels (not all combinations possible due to bitrate constraints)
 MPEG Layer 2 (MP2): 48 kHz, up to 5.1 channels (required in PAL players only)
 Dolby Digital (DD, also known as AC-3): 48 kHz, 32–448 kbit/s, up to 5.1 channels
 Digital Theater Systems (DTS): 754 kbit/s or 1510 kbit/s (not required for DVD player compliance)
 NTSC DVDs must contain at least one LPCM or Dolby Digital audio track.
 PAL DVDs must contain at least one MPEG Layer 2, LPCM, or Dolby Digital audio track.
 Players are not required to play back audio with more than two channels, but must be able to downmix multichannel audio to two channels.
 GOP structure (Group Of Pictures)
 Sequence header must be present at the beginning of every GOP
 Maximum frames per GOP: 18 (NTSC) / 15 (PAL), i.e. 0.6 seconds both
 Closed GOP required for multi-angle DVDs

HDV

HDV is a format for recording and playback of high-definition MPEG-2 video on a DV cassette tape.

MOD and TOD

MOD and TOD are recording formats for use in consumer digital file-based camcorders.

XDCAM

XDCAM is a professional file-based video recording format.

DVB
Application-specific restrictions on MPEG-2 video in the DVB standard:

Allowed resolutions for SDTV:
 720, 640, 544, 528, 480 or 352 × 480 pixel, 24/1.001, 24, 30/1.001 or 30 frame/s
 352 × 240 pixel, 24/1.001, 24, 30/1.001 or 30 frame/s
 720, 704, 544, 528, 480 or 352 × 576 pixel, 25 frame/s
 352 × 288 pixel, 25 frame/s
For HDTV:
 720 x 576 x 50 frame/s progressive  (576p50)
 1280 x 720 x 25 or 50 frame/s progressive  (720p50)
 1440 or 1920 x 1080 x 25 frame/s progressive (1080p25 = film mode)
 1440 or 1920 x 1080 x 25 frame/s interlace (1080i50)

ATSC

The ATSC A/53 standard used in the United States, uses MPEG-2 video at the Main Profile @ High Level (MP@HL), with additional restrictions such as the maximum bitrate of 19.39 Mbit/s for broadcast television and 38.8 Mbit/s for cable television, 4:2:0 chroma subsampling format, and mandatory colorimetry information.

ATSC allows the following video resolutions, aspect ratios, and frame/field rates:
 1920 × 1080 pixel (16:9, square pixels), at 30p, 29.97p, 24p, 23.976p, 60i, 59.94i.
 1280 × 720 pixel (16:9, square pixels), at 60p, 59.94p, 30p, 29.97p, 24p, or 23.976p
 704 × 480 pixel (4:3 or 16:9, non-square pixels), at 60p, 59.94p, 30p, 29.97p, 24p, 23.976p, 60i, or 59.94i
 640 × 480 pixel (4:3, square pixels), at 60p, 59.94p, 30p, 29.97p, 24p, 23.976p, 60i, or 59.94i

ATSC standard A/63 defines additional resolutions and aspect rates for 50 Hz (PAL) signal.

The ATSC specification and MPEG-2 allow the use of progressive frames, even within an interlaced video sequence. For example, a station that transmits 1080i60 video sequence can use a coding method where those 60 fields are coded with 24 progressive frames and metadata instructs the decoder to interlace them and perform 3:2 pulldown before display. This allows broadcasters to switch between 60 Hz interlaced (news, soap operas) and 24 Hz progressive (prime-time) content without ending the MPEG-2 sequence and introducing several seconds of delay as the TV switches formats. This is the reason why 1080p30 and 1080p24 sequences allowed by the ATSC specification are not used in practice.

The 1080-line formats are encoded with 1920 × 1088 pixel luma matrices and 960 × 540 chroma matrices, but the last 8 lines are discarded by the MPEG-2 decoding and display process.

ATSC A/72 is the newest revision of ATSC standards for digital television, which allows the use of H.264/AVC video coding format and 1080p60 signal.

MPEG-2 audio was a contender for the ATSC standard during the DTV "Grand Alliance" shootout, but lost out to Dolby AC-3.

ISDB-T
Technical features of MPEG-2 in ATSC are also valid for ISDB-T, except that in the main TS has aggregated a second program for mobile devices compressed in MPEG-4 H.264 AVC for video and AAC-LC for audio, mainly known as 1seg.

Blu-ray

MPEG-2 is one of the three supported video coding formats supported by Blu-ray Disc. Early Blu-ray releases typically used MPEG-2 video, but recent releases are almost always in  H.264 or occasionally VC-1. Only MPEG-2 video (MPEG-2 part 2) is supported, Blu-ray does not support MPEG-2 audio (parts 3 and 7). Additionally, the container format used on Blu-ray discs is an MPEG-2 transport stream, regardless of which audio and video codecs are used.

Patent pool
As of February 14, 2020, MPEG-2 Patents have expired worldwide, with the exception of only Malaysia. The last US patent expired on February 23, 2018.

MPEG LA, a private patent licensing organization, had acquired rights from over 20 corporations and one university to license a patent pool of approximately 640 worldwide patents, which it claimed were "essential" to use of MPEG-2 technology. The patent holders included Sony, Mitsubishi Electric, Fujitsu, Panasonic, Scientific Atlanta, Columbia University, Philips, General Instrument, Canon, Hitachi, JVC Kenwood, LG Electronics, NTT, Samsung, Sanyo, Sharp and Toshiba. Where Software patentability is upheld and patents have not expired (only Malaysia), the use of MPEG-2 requires the payment of licensing fees to the patent holders. Other patents were licensed by Audio MPEG, Inc. The development of the standard itself took less time than the patent negotiations. Patent pooling between essential and peripheral patent holders in the MPEG-2 pool was the subject of a study by the University of Wisconsin.

According to the MPEG-2 licensing agreement any use of MPEG-2 technology in countries with active patents (Malaysia) is subject to royalties. MPEG-2 encoders and decoders are subject to $0.35 per unit. Also, any packaged medium (DVDs/Data Streams) is subject to licence fees according to length of recording/broadcast. The royalties were previously priced higher but were lowered at several points, most recently on January 1, 2018. 
An earlier criticism of the MPEG-2 patent pool was that even though the number of patents had decreased from 1,048 to 416 by June 2013 the license fee had not decreased with the expiration rate of MPEG-2 patents.

Patent holders 
The following organizations have held patents for MPEG-2, as listed at MPEG LA. See also List of United States MPEG-2 patents.

See also
 MPEG-1 Audio Layer II (MP2)
 MPEG-1 Audio Layer III (MP3)
 DVD
 DVB-S2
 ISO/IEC JTC 1/SC 29
 Moving Picture Experts Group

References

External links 
 A Beginners Guide for MPEG-2 Standard
 MPEG-2 Overview (figures are lost)
 MPEG-2 video compression
 MIT 6.344 – Slides from lectures on video compression at MIT.
 A Discrete Cosine Transform tutorial
 IPTV MPEG and Quality of Experience Testing
 OpenIPMP: Open Source DRM Project for MPEG-2
 ISO/IEC 13818 – MPEG-2 at the ISO Store.
 MPEG Books - A list of MPEG reference books.
  - Recommended Practice: Guide to the Use of the ATSC Digital Television Standard, including Corrigendum No. 1

 
Audio codecs
Video codecs
Interactive television
ISO/IEC standards
Open standards covered by patents
Video compression
Videotelephony